José María Galán Rodríguez (1904–1978) was a Spanish military officer. He served in the Spanish Civil War. He was the brother of Fermín Galán, leader of the Jaca Uprising, and Francisco Galán. Before the war, he was a lieutenant of the Carabineros.

Civil war 
José María Galán remained loyal to the Spanish government during the coup of July 1936 that triggered the Civil War. In July 1936, he led a militia column in the Somosierra front. In October 1936 he led the 3rd Mixed Brigade, one of the first such units to be established. 

Later he took part in the Second Battle of the Corunna Road. In June 1937 he led the 34th Division in the Segovia Offensive. In 1938, he led the XXIII Army Corps in Andalusia.

After the war, he fled to the USSR and later exiled himself to Cuba. He died there in 1978.

See also
3rd Mixed Brigade
José_María_Galán (Spanish)

Notes

1904 births
1978 deaths
 Spanish army officers
 Communist Party of Spain politicians
 Spanish military personnel of the Spanish Civil War (Republican faction)
 Exiles of the Spanish Civil War in Cuba
 Spanish emigrants to Cuba
 Exiles of the Spanish Civil War in the Soviet Union